Athous caviformis is a species of brown-coloured click beetles which can be found in Hungary, Croatia, and Bosnia and Herzegovina.

References

Beetles described in 1905
Beetles of Europe
Dendrometrinae